Ronald Petrovický (born February 15, 1977) is a Slovak former ice hockey right winger. He played professionally in Europe and in North America in the National Hockey League (NHL) as well as international play for the Slovak national ice hockey team.

Playing career
As a youth, Petrovický played in the 1991 Quebec International Pee-Wee Hockey Tournament with a team from Poprad.

Petrovicky moved to Canada to play junior hockey with the Tri-City Americans, Prince George Cougars and the Regina Pats of the Western Hockey League (WHL). While a member of the Cougars, the Calgary Flames chose him in the 1996 NHL Entry Draft. He would sign with the Flames organization in 1998, and played for the Flames' American Hockey League (AHL) affiliate for two seasons before joining Calgary. He played two seasons for the NHL team before joining the New York Rangers for the 2002–03 season. A year later, he was transferred to the Atlanta Thrashers, again as a waiver transaction.

During the NHL lockout, Petrovicky played his first professional hockey in Europe, playing for Zilina and Brynas. He played one more season with the Thrashers before joining the Pittsburgh Penguins. For the 2007-08 season, Petrovicky moved to Europe, playing for Dukla Trencin, EV Zug and Modo Hockey. He signed with Dinamo Riga for the 2008–09 season. He was released on 24 December 2008.

Just before the 2009 NHL pre-season, Petrovicky was invited to training camp by the Vancouver Canucks but was released from camp on September 23, 2009.

International
He also played with the Slovak national ice hockey team in the 2000 and 2004 Ice Hockey World Championships. He won the silver medal as part of the 2000 Slovak team.

Career statistics

Regular season and playoffs

International

Awards and achievements
 Named to the WHL East Second All-Star Team in 1998

References

External links
 
 Ronald Petrovický at the Atlanta Thrashers page

1977 births
Living people
Atlanta Thrashers players
Brynäs IF players
Calgary Flames draft picks
Calgary Flames players
Dinamo Riga players
EV Zug players
Ice hockey players at the 2006 Winter Olympics
Modo Hockey players
New York Rangers players
Olympic ice hockey players of Slovakia
Pittsburgh Penguins players
Prince George Cougars players
Regina Pats players
Saint John Flames players
Slovak expatriate ice hockey players in Canada
Slovak expatriate ice hockey players in the United States
Slovak ice hockey right wingers
Sportspeople from Žilina
Springfield Falcons players
Tri-City Americans players
Wilkes-Barre/Scranton Penguins players
Slovak expatriate ice hockey players in Sweden
Slovak expatriate ice hockey players in Switzerland
Slovak expatriate sportspeople in Latvia
Expatriate ice hockey players in Latvia
Expatriate ice hockey players in Slovakia